International Superstar Soccer (known as Jikkyō World Soccer in Japan) is the name of a series of football video games developed by Japanese company Konami, mostly by their Osaka branch, Konami Computer Entertainment Osaka (KCEO). Titles in the series appeared on Super NES, Mega Drive, Nintendo 64, Sega Saturn, PlayStation, PlayStation 2, Xbox, GameCube, and Microsoft Windows. International Superstar Soccer should not be confused with Konami Computer Entertainment Tokyo's Pro Evolution Soccer series (also known as Winning Eleven), which was originally developed for the PlayStation.

Releases

Consoles

Portable

Goal Storm / ISS Pro series

See also
 List of J.League licensed video games
 List of Konami games
 Konami Hyper Soccer
 Super Sidekicks
 International Track & Field
 Legendary Eleven

References

 
Konami franchises
Video game franchises introduced in 1994